Joseph Frederic Guy Claude Evans (April 28, 1933 — July 7, 1982) was a Canadian professional ice hockey goaltender who played five games in the National Hockey League for the Montreal Canadiens and Boston Bruins between 1954 and 1958. He was born in Longueuil, Quebec and died in Greenfield Park, Quebec.

Career statistics

Regular season and playoffs

References

External links
 

1933 births
1982 deaths
Boston Bruins players
Canadian expatriate ice hockey players in the United States
Canadian ice hockey goaltenders
Cincinnati Mohawks (IHL) players
Ice hockey people from Quebec
Kitchener Beavers (EPHL) players
Montreal Canadiens players
Pittsburgh Hornets players
Providence Reds players
Sportspeople from Longueuil
Springfield Indians players
Trois-Rivières Lions (EPHL) players
Vancouver Canucks (WHL) players
Victoria Cougars (1949–1961) players